The Men's individual normal hill event of the FIS Nordic World Ski Championships 2017 was held on 25 February 2017.

Results

Qualification
The qualification was held on 24 February 2017.

Final
The final was held on 25 February 2017.

References

Men's individual normal hill